Tadeusz Gwiazdowski (1 September 1918 – 12 December 1983) was a Polish actor. He appeared in more than 30 films and television shows between 1957 and 1981.

Selected filmography
 Kanał (1957)
 Noose (1958)

References

External links

1918 births
1983 deaths
Polish male film actors
People from Duisburg